Macrobrachium dienbienphuense is a species of shrimp of the family Palaemonidae. Macrobrachium dienbienphuense will walk on land to avoid dams and rapids, a behavior known as "parading". While doing so, they are vulnerable to predators such as spiders.

References

Crustaceans described in 1972
Crustaceans of Asia
Palaemonidae